St. Anne (sometimes spelled Saint Anne) is a village in Kankakee County, Illinois, United States. The population was 1,161 at the 2020 census. It is part of the Kankakee–Bourbonnais–Bradley Metropolitan Statistical Area. It was founded in 1851 by Charles Chiniquy, a French-Canadian Roman Catholic priest and friend of the 16th U.S. President Abraham Lincoln who was excommunicated by the Roman Catholic Church in 1856. He later converted to Protestant Christianity, becoming a Presbyterian Evangelical minister and a well-known temperance activist in Canada and the United States.

Geography
St. Anne is located in southeastern Kankakee County at  (41.023363, -87.717050). Illinois Route 1 passes through the west side of the village.

Demographics

As of the census of 2000, there were 1,212 people, 464 households, and 330 families residing in the village. The racial makeup of the village was 89.85% White, 0.83% African American, 0.41% Native American, 0.08% Asian, 0.08% Pacific Islander, 6.60% from other races, and 2.15% from two or more races. Hispanic or Latino of any race were 10.48% of the population.

There were 464 households, out of which 36.9% had children under the age of 18 living with them, 55.0% were married couples living together, 11.2% had a female householder with no husband present, and 28.7% were non-families. 23.3% of all households were made up of individuals, and 11.2% had someone living alone who was 65 years of age or older. The average household size was 2.61 and the average family size was 3.08.

In the village, the population was spread out, with 30.0% under the age of 18, 8.3% from 18 to 24, 28.1% from 25 to 44, 20.2% from 45 to 64, and 13.5% who were 65 years of age or older. The median age was 34 years. For every 100 females, there were 96.4 males. For every 100 females age 18 and over, there were 89.5 males.

The median income for a household in the village was $39,306, and the median income for a family was $41,250. Males had a median income of $32,000 versus $25,086 for females. The per capita income for the village was $16,702. About 11.7% of families and 13.4% of the population were below the poverty line, including 18.2% of those under age 18 and 6.4% of those age 65 or over.

Political affiliation 
St. Anne is generally a community which votes in favor of America's Republican Party. In the 2020 presidential election, the town and the surrounding communities voted 696 to 246 (72% to 26%) in favor of incumbent Republican president Donald Trump as opposed to Democratic Party candidate Joe Biden. However, a majority of St. Anne's is part of Illinois's 2nd congressional district, which is currently represented by Democrat Robin Kelly, though part of the town also falls under Illinois' 16th district and Republican representative Adam Kinzinger.

Education 
St. Anne Community High School is the sole high school within the region, and an elementary school also named for the town exists across the street from the high school. The closest institution of higher education to St. Anne is Kankakee Community College.

Transportation 
Illinois Route 1, part of the Western route of the historic Dixie Highway, runs north and south in St. Anne. Interstate 57 is the closest interstate highway to St Anne. The town is also located about 5 miles away from the banks of the Iroquois River, which itself connects to the rest of the world through the Mississippi, Illinois, and Kankakee Rivers.

St. Anne has no passenger railroad services of its own, however, Union Pacific Railroad owns freight rail tracks which pass through the city. St. Anne formerly was served by passenger rail, then operated by the New York Central Railroad, the Missouri Pacific Railroad and the Chicago and Eastern Illinois Railroad.

Air transport is limited in St. Anne, with the closest airport being the general aviation-exclusive Kankakee Airport. Commercial air service's closest links to St. Anne are through the two major Chicago airports, with Midway being slightly closer to St. Anne than O'Hare.

Notable people
 Jack Sikma, seven-time NBA All-Star and Hall of Fame center for 1979 NBA champion Seattle SuperSonics; attended St. Anne High School

 In 2009, a couple who were renovating an abandoned house on the outskirts of St. Anne discovered that it contained a trove of manuscripts by African-American composer Florence Price.  The house had been Price's summer residence.  The collection contained dozens of pieces that had been thought lost.

See also
Revolution, television series that dramatized St. Anne, Illinois

References

External links
Official website

Villages in Kankakee County, Illinois
Villages in Illinois